National Information & Credit Evaluation, or NICE Group, is a credit information group with operations in South Korea.

Formerly known as National Information & Credit Evaluation Inc., NICE GROUP was founded in 1986. It launched a credit information service in 1989 for the first time in Korea and has gradually expanded its business scope into adjacent areas, including ATM, credit card VAN and asset management. NICE GROUP's business portfolio consists of three major pillars: credit information, financial service and manufacturing.

The company's shares are listed on the Korea Composite Stock Price Index, or KOSPI.

External links
 Official website
 nicecredit.com

Credit rating agencies
Financial services companies of South Korea